is a holding company headquartered in Chiyoda, Tokyo, and a wholly owned subsidiary of Industrial Growth Platform, Inc. Michinori Holdings rehabilitates deficit companies which have so much liability that they cannot act as an administrator of assets. It manages them by acquiring and holding their shares until they return to financial stability and viability.

As of 2022, Michinori Holdings currently holds and operates subsidiaries in the transportation sector, including bus, railway, and monorail companies. They are:

 Fukushima Transportation, since 2008
 Shonan Monorail, since 2015
 Sado Kisen (ferry company), since 2022
 Aizu Bus, since 2011
 Kanto Transportation, since 2012
 Northern Iwate Transportation, since 2010
 Ibaraki Kotsu (bus company), since 2009
 Higashinihon Kotsu (bus company), since 2018
Some expressway bus routes operated by affiliated companies of Michinori Holdings are named "Michinori Express" (MEX), designed by Yasuyuki Kawanishi, who also designed West Express Ginga.

Aizu Bus

The  is a wholly owned subsidiary of Michinori Holdings. Tobu Group had shares of this company until 2011.

Its subsidiaries include Aizu Travel Service and Aizu Bus/Auto Service. It also owns Aizu Taxi.

Outline 
Aizu Bus Company was established in 1943. It operates bus routes around Aizuwakamatsu in Fukushima Prefecture, many of which are based at Aizu-Tajima Station, Aizukōgen-Ozeguchi Station, and Aizu-Wakamatsu Station. Service area has many tourist spots, including Ōuchi-juku, Tō-no-Hetsuri, Aizuwakamatsu Castle, Lake Inawashiro, Mount Bandai, and Oze National Park.

Its headquarters are located at 195 Byakkocho, Aizuwakamatsu. Until 2011, the company also had a headquarters with Tobu Railway in Oshiage, Sumida, Tokyo.

History 
21 March 1943 – Company was established. Later that year, due to unification during World War II, additional routes were transferred to it, including those of Kihan Motor.
December 1953 – Transferred bus routes between Aizu-Tajima Station and Kinugawaonsen Station from Tobu Railway
10 July – "Aizu-Wakamatsu – Koriyama – Iwaki Line" was operated as "limited express" with Fukushima Transportation and Joban Kotsu Motor 
9 October 1987 – Discontinued bus routes between Aizu-Tajima and Kinugawaonsen due to opening of Yagan Railway.
20 January 1996 – "Aizu-Wakamatsu – Koriyama – Iwaki Line" was operated as "Expressway bus" and ran via Joban Expressway
24 May 1996 – Commenced operating Low Emission Bus between Aizu-Tajima Station and Oze National Park
2 October 1997 – Commenced operating "Aizu-Wakamatsu – Niigata Line" as "Expressway bus" with Niigata Kotsu
1 October 2009 – Aizu Taxi merged into Aizu Bus
2 December 2010 – Received support from "Regional Economy Vitalization Corporation of Japan"
2 August 2013 – "Regional Economy Vitalization Corporation of Japan" transferred its shares of Aizu Bus Company to Michinori Holdings. On 30 August, the transfer was completed, and since then, the bus company has belonged to Michinori Holdings.

Bus routes 
Routemap

Further reading 
 Story of Aizu Bus
 Story of Aizu Bus

Kanto Transportation 

 is a wholly owned subsidiary of Michinori Holdings.

Outline 
The bus company was established as Kanto Motor LLC in 1923. After acquiring other companies, it changed to Kanto Transportation, Inc. on 8 May 1927. In 2004, the company requested and received management support from Industrial Revitalization Corporation of Japan due to financial difficulties. This company belonged to Jay Coach (an affiliated company of Jay Will Partners) until 2012, when it was transferred to Michinori Holdings.

Kanto Transportation acquired Toya Kotsu on 1 October 2018. Additionally, this company capitalizes Utsunomiya Light Rail at 11%.

Its headquarters are located at 4-25-5 Yanase, Utsunomiya, Tochigi Prefecture.

Bus routes

Affiliated companies

Nasu Ropeway 
Kanto Transportation also operates a ropeway on Mount Nasu. The ropeway is 812 m long, has an elevation gain of 294 m, and takes 3 minutes and 40 seconds (one-way). It has a capacity of 111 people.
The ropeway has two stations: Sanroku Station (where passengers can transfer to buses for Nasu-Shiobara Station) and Sancho Station (on Mount Chausu).

Yashio Kankō Bus 

 was established in June 1984 as part of Toya Kotsu, a subsidiary of Tobu Railway until 1 December 2016, when it was transferred to Michinori Holdings. In October 2018, Toya Kotsu was merged into Kanto Transportation.

Bus routes

Discontinued companies

Toya Kotsu 

 was a subsidiary of Tobu Railway until 2016, when it was transferred to Michinori Holdings. In 2018, it was merged into Kanto Transportation.

This bus company was established as Toya Railway in 1916. It began operating bus routes in 1928 and acquired other bus companies by 1934. The railway stations between Yutsuue Station and Nasu-Ogawa Station were discontinued in 1939. There was a planned extension from Nasu-Oagawa Station to Hitachi-Daigo Station. However, Toya Railway completely discontinued its railway line in 1968, and was renamed to Toya Kotsu in June 1969.

Toya Kotsu belonged to Tobu Railway from 1964 until 2016, at which time its shares were transferred to Michinori Holdings. In 2018, it was merged into Kanto Transportation. Nasu Ropeway and Yashio Kankō Bus were affiliated companies of Toya Kotsu until the merger in 2018.

Northern Iwate Transportation 

 is a bus company and wholly owned subsidiary of Michinori Holdings since 2010. 

The company was established on 13 April 1943 as Iwate Kenpoku Motor, following the consolidation of bus companies in Iwate during World War II. It was renamed on 26 April 2009 as Northern Iwate Transportation. On 1 April 2010, it became an affiliated company of Michinori Holdings.

In 2016, Michinori Holdings began transferring Nambu Bus to this company. By 2017, the business of Nambu Bus was inherited by Northern Iwate Transportation.

The company headquarters are located at 1-17-18 Kuriyagawa, Morioka, Iwate.

This company is invested in the Iwate Galaxy Railway Line. The Iwate Galaxy Railway Company is based at Kuriyagawa Station.

Bus routes

Beam.1

Urban 
Sendai Port・Sendai Station (Miyagi)・Morioka Station

Asunaro

YODEL

Umineko

Hachimori 
Morioka Bus Center・Morioka Station ⇔ Jōbōji, Iwate・Karumai, Iwate・Hachinohe Inter・Hon-Hachinohe Station・Hachinohe LAPIA BT・Hachinohe Ferry Terminal

Michinoku

Nambu Bus 

This bus company was merged into Northern Iwate Transportation on 1 March 2017, and the company was discontinued in 2018.

The company was establishment as Gonohe Electric Railway on 21 February 1926. It opened rail lines between Shirinai Station and Kami-Shichizaki Station (23 August 1929), between Kami-Shichizaki and Shitogishi (10 October 1929), and between Shitogishi and Gonohe Station (1 April 1930). On 28 October 1931, the company began offering bus services as well. The company was renamed "Gonohe Railway" 1936 and subsequently Nambu Railway in 1945.

Operation of the railway line was suspended following the 1968 Tokachi earthquake, and in April 1969, the company discontinued its railway business. On 30 May 1970, it was renamed to Nambu Bus.

Nambu Railway

Ibaraki Kotsu 

 is a bus company that operates many bus routes in Ibaraki. It is a wholly owned subsidiary of Michinori Holdings. Affiliated companies include the Hitachinaka Seaside Railway and Kanto Railway.

The service area is based at Mito Station and covers northern and central Ibaraki Prefecture and southern Tochigi Prefecture.

Outline 

Ibaraki Kotsu was established on 1 August 1944 due to integration during World War II. It was formed as the merger of three railway companies: Suihin Densha (established 1921; discontinued 1966), Ibaraki Railway (established 1923; discontinued 1971), and Minato Railway (established 1907). Following the merger, Ibaraki Kotsu controlled three lines: the Suihin Line, the Ibaraki Line, and the Minato Line. In 2008, the Ibaraki Kotsu Minato Line was transferred to Hitachinaka Seaside Railway.

In October 1992, Ibako Kenhoku Bus was established, but later merged into Ibaraki Kotsu in February 2010. On 1 June 2010, Ibaraki Auto was also merged into Ibaraki Kotsu.

Hitachi Dentetsu Kotsu Service was merged into this company on 1 May 2019, and the Hitachi Dentetsu Taxi was renamed to Dentetsu Taxi.

Nanohana Kotsu, a tourist bus company, became an affiliated company of Ibaraki Kotsu.

Requested Civil Rehabilitation 
By the late 2000s, Ibaraki Kotsu had too debt, so the company applied under the Civil Rehabilitation Act. On 19 November 2008, it was determined that the company would be reconstructed. On 27 March 2009, Industrial Growth Platform began supporting the company, and established IBAKO Co., Ltd. which inherited the assets of Ibaraki Kotsu.

Hitachi Dentetsu Kotsu 

 was a bus company that operated many bus routes in Ibaraki. In 2019, this company was discontinued and merged into Ibaraki Kotsu. Until 1 April 2005, this company had operated the Hitachi Electric Railway Line.

Higashinihon Kotsu 

 is a bus company that operates bus routes in Iwate. It is a wholly owned subsidiary of Michinori Holdings.

Outline 
The firm was established as Chuo Kanko in 1974. The registered persisting company was established on 16 January 1979 as Chuo Kanko LLC. On 24 April 2018, a manager requested acquisition from Michinori Holdings because of old age.

Bus routes

Parent company 

 is a holding company located in Chiyoda, Tokyo. Nanki-Shirahama Airport is also managed by Industrial Growth Platform.

The company servants are transferred from Industrial Revitalization Corporation of Japan. Its main business was management reconstruction for companies that had too many liabilities to continue operating, but that still had business resources.

See also 
Tōbu Bus Nikko
Asahi Motor Corporation
Keihin Kyuko Electric Railway
Seibu Railway
Tokyu Corporation
Kokusai Kogyo
Kokusai Tohoku
Ryobi Holdings

References

External links 

Official Website

Aizuwakamatsu
Japanese companies established in 1943
Tobu Railway
Bus companies of Japan
Ferry companies of Japan
Transport in Iwate Prefecture
Transport in Fukushima Prefecture
Transport in Ibaraki Prefecture
Transport in Kanagawa Prefecture
Transport in Tochigi Prefecture
Transport in Aomori Prefecture
Transport in Miyagi Prefecture
Transport in Chiba Prefecture
Transport in Niigata Prefecture
Fukushima Transportation
Chiyoda, Tokyo
Japanese companies established in 2009